Palacios Airport  is an airstrip serving the village of Palacios in Gracias a Dios Department, Honduras.

An overrun to the west will drop into the lagoon.

See also

Transport in Honduras
List of airports in Honduras

References

External links
 HERE Maps - Palacios
 OpenStreetMap - Palacios
 OurAirports - Palacios Airport

Airports in Honduras